The Coliseum Theater, a former cinema in Seattle, Washington, opened January 8, 1916. It was listed on the National Register of Historic Places in 1975, and is also an official Seattle city landmark. Designed by B. Marcus Priteca, it was Seattle's first theater built specifically for showing movies, and was one of the first cinemas anywhere to strive for architectural grandeur. When it opened, it was advertised as "the world's largest and finest photoplay palace." In 1931, the Journal of the Royal Institute of Architects called it "the first of the world's movie palaces."

The exterior features elaborate terra cotta work, and the original interior was comparably ornate. When it opened in the silent film era, it boasted a 7-piece orchestra plus an organist; the giant organ was made by Moller, and the musicians—all Russians—were reputed to be the highest-paid movie theater musicians in the country. Anita King attended the opening night to give a speech dedicating the theater.

The Coliseum continued as a first-run theater into the late 1970s, and continued to show films until 1990. It closed on March 11, 1990, and was renovated into a  Banana Republic clothing store that opened in 1994. The store closed in 2020.

References

Theatres completed in 1916
1910s architecture in the United States
National Register of Historic Places in Seattle
Former cinemas in the United States
Terracotta
Buildings and structures in Seattle
Cinemas and movie theaters in Washington (state)
Theatres on the National Register of Historic Places in Washington (state)
Downtown Seattle